Kirill Vladimirovich Kirsanov (born 19 September 2002) is a Russian ice hockey defenceman who plays for SKA Saint Petersburg in the Kontinental Hockey League (KHL). He was selected by the Los Angeles Kings in the third-round, 84th overall, of the 2021 NHL Entry Draft.

Career statistics

Regular season and playoffs

International

References

External links
 

2002 births
Living people
Los Angeles Kings draft picks
Russian ice hockey defencemen
SKA Saint Petersburg players
SKA-Neva players
SKA-1946 players
Sportspeople from Tver